Záborie is a village and municipality in Martin District in the Žilina Region of northern Slovakia.

History
In historical records the village was first mentioned in 1353.

Geography
The municipality lies at an altitude of 489 metres and covers an area of 5.196 km². It has a population of about 123 people.

External links
https://web.archive.org/web/20070513023228/http://www.statistics.sk/mosmis/eng/run.html

Villages and municipalities in Martin District